The 12"/40 caliber gun (spoken as "twelve-inch-forty--caliber") were used for the primary batteries of the United States Navy's last class of monitors and the  and  pre-dreadnought battleships.

Design
The /40 caliber gun was developed after the Spanish–American War to use the new smokeless powder that had recently been adopted by the Navy. The Mark 3, gun Nos. 15–48 and 50–56, was constructed of tube, jacket, and eight hoops. It was found that the early guns suffered from excessive bore erosion, in an attempt to fix this the Navy reduced the propellant charges to reduce the muzzle velocity, because of this the Mark 4, gun Nos. 49, 58–60, 150–154, and 179, was similar to the Mark 3 but with a smaller chamber for the reduced propellant charge.

Service history
The guns mounted in the Virginia-class battleships were in an unusual two-level turret with the /45 caliber guns on top of the larger 12-inch guns. This arrangement ultimately proved unsuccessful but helped the Navy in the successful development of superfiring turrets later used in the dreadnought .

Incident
Gun No. 49, while testing powder at the Naval Proving Ground, had the entire muzzle and chase blow off. The board appointed to investigate came to the conclusion that the new powder, while performing properly, caused a pressure along the chase that was dangerously close to the strength curve. It was decided that when the guns were withdrawn to be relined they would add an additional hoop that extended to the muzzle would be placed on the chase.

Naval Service

Notes

References

Books
 
 

Online sources

External links
 Bluejackets Manual, 1917, 4th revision: US Navy 14-inch Mark 1 gun

Naval guns of the United States
305 mm artillery